In geometry, the order-5 hexagonal tiling is a regular tiling of the hyperbolic plane. It has Schläfli symbol of {6,5}.

Related polyhedra and tiling 
This tiling is topologically related as a part of sequence of regular tilings with order-5 vertices with Schläfli symbol {n,5}, and Coxeter diagram , progressing to infinity.

This tiling is topologically related as a part of sequence of regular tilings with hexagonal faces, starting with the hexagonal tiling, with Schläfli symbol {6,n}, and Coxeter diagram , progressing to infinity.

References
 John H. Conway, Heidi Burgiel, Chaim Goodman-Strass, The Symmetries of Things 2008,  (Chapter 19, The Hyperbolic Archimedean Tessellations)

See also

Square tiling
Tilings of regular polygons
List of uniform planar tilings
List of regular polytopes

External links 

 Hyperbolic and Spherical Tiling Gallery
 KaleidoTile 3: Educational software to create spherical, planar and hyperbolic tilings
 Hyperbolic Planar Tessellations, Don Hatch

Hexagonal tilings
Hyperbolic tilings
Isogonal tilings
Isohedral tilings
Order-5 tilings
Regular tilings